Vic Seixas and Shirley Fry were the defending champions, but Fry did not compete. Seixas partnered with Louise Brough, but they lost in the fourth round to Luis Ayala and Thelma Long.

Mervyn Rose and Darlene Hard defeated Neale Fraser and Althea Gibson in the final, 6–4, 7–5 to win the mixed doubles tennis title at the 1957 Wimbledon Championships.

Seeds

  Vic Seixas /  Shirley Fry (fourth round)
  Neale Fraser /  Althea Gibson (final)
  Jiří Javorský /  Věra Pužejová (third round)
  Mervyn Rose /  Darlene Hard (champions)

Draw

Finals

Top half

Section 1

Section 2

Section 3

Section 4

Bottom half

Section 5

Section 6

Section 7

Section 8

References

External links

X=Mixed Doubles
Wimbledon Championship by year – Mixed doubles